LSL Property Services is the parent company of e.surv Chartered Surveyors, Your Move and Reeds Rains, and forms the second-largest estate agent chain in the United Kingdom.

History 
LSL was created following the management buy out of Your Move and e.surv Chartered Surveyors from Aviva (formerly Norwich Union) by Lending Solutions Limited in July 2004. The original estate agency and surveying and valuations businesses were created following a series of acquisitions undertaken by General Accident between 1985 and 1988. These businesses were originally re-branded as General Accident Property Services and General Accident Valuation Services and became Your Move and e.surv Chartered Surveyors in November 1999.

Your Move 
Your Move Estate Agents has over 180 branches across the UK. Your Move's services include residential property services, lettings, and  mortgage and remortgage services. Your Move was originally set up in the late 1980s by well known UK insurers, General Accident. By 1989, GA Property Services, latterly trading as General Accident Property Services (GAPS), owned 69 estate agencies and in 1995, the surveying division of GAPS became a separate company - GA Valuation and Survey (GAVS). In November 1999, following the General Accident and Commercial Union merger, GAPS rebranded to Your Move and GAVS rebranded to e.surv.

Reeds Rains
Reeds Rains is an estate agency operating in the UK. The firm has its origins in two companies; Samuel Rains and Son and Reeds.

Samuel Rains and Sons was established by its namesake; Samuel Rains in Manchester in 1868. The office moved to The Crescent, Cheadle in 1946 after World War II. The firm was strongly established as a family business and by the time the company celebrated is Centenary in 1968, Rains' three great-grandchildren were partners in the firm. Michael Gass joined the company as a fourth partner and at this point Samuel Rains and Sons boasted a chain of five branches. By the time of the merger with Reeds, the company operated twenty five branches.

The firm of Reeds had its roots in a firm established in Preston in 1870 by a George Wrightson. After his death in 1890, his assistant Edward Reed took over the business. As with Samuel Rains and Sons, the company was a family business and after the World War I, Harold and George Reed (Edward's sons) joined the company. They sold the firm to Basil Crosley in 1956 and by 1972 Crosley had expanded the business to comprise four partners including his own son John. The name of the company was changed to Reeds and further branches were acquired through a merger with the firm of Petty and Co in 1976. By the time of their merger with Samuel Rains and Sons, Reeds operated sixteen branches.

The two firms merged in 1982 and the large logistical task of renaming the offices and replacing over five hundred for sale boards was complete within two weeks. The name of the merged firm was decided by the flip of a coin. The business grew rapidly, and used innovative marketing techniques such as television advertising on local ITV station Granada.

In 1986 the fifty-two strong chain was purchased by the financial services company; Prudential, for £24 million. The Reeds Rains name was re-established following a £3.4 million management buyout in 1991 and the firm set about expanding once again, including the purchase of Britannia Building Society's estate agency in November 1998.

Reeds Rains was purchased by LSL in 2005. Reeds Rains has over 150 branches across England, Northern Ireland and Wales.

LSL Land & New Homes 
LSL Land & New Homes, through the Estate Agency businesses provides a complete range of services for house builders, developers and investors of all sizes.

Group First: Mortgages First and Insurance First Brokers 
Group First, which was acquired in 2016, provides mortgage and protection brokerage services to purchasers of new homes through its subsidiaries: Mortgages First and Insurance Brokers First.

LSLi 
LSLi is the holding company and financial services provider for nine estate agency brands with a network of 65 branches. The brands in the LSLi network are based predominantly in and around Greater London and the Home Counties.

Frosts, Lawlors, Intercounty, Goodfellows, Lauristons, Hawes & Co, Thomas Morris, JNP, Davis Tate.

Asset management 
LSL's asset management companies are market leaders in the sale of residential properties on behalf of corporate clients. In 2016 they managed 2,556 repossessions

utilising a network of up to 1,471 estate agency branches nationwide.

St Trinity Asset Management 
The Group's second asset management business was created in 2010 and specialises in repossession property sales as well as off ering a range of other

services including part exchanged property sales, bulk property disposal, auction sales, property relocations and conveyancing.

LSL Corporate Client Department 
LSL CCD operates a repossessions asset management business and a property management business for multi-property landlords and is a leading property specialist,

providing services to national and global institutions.

Templeton LPA 
Templeton Law of Property Act fixed charge receiver joined the Group in 2010.

Halifax Estate Agencies
During the 1980s many banks and insurance companies purchased estate agencies with a view to using these as a vehicle to sell their financial products. Building Societies also joined the fray by taking advantage of the Building Societies Act 1986; this resulted in the creation of Halifax Estate Agencies Ltd (HEAL). In 1995 Halifax Building Society merged with Leeds Permanent Building Society and their subsidiary; Property Leeds UK Limited which unlike HEAL had largely retained the names of those estate agencies it had purchased, including Frank Farr & Sons and Gale & Power. Some of these firms dated back to the 1800s. Property Leeds was absorbed HEAL and although some branches were rebranded to carry the name 'Halifax', others retained their identities. HEAL was retained by Halifax plc and its successor HBOS until their purchase by Lloyds Banking Group in 2009.

In October 2009 Lloyds announced the sale of HEAL's 218 branches to LSL for a nominal consideration of £1. These acquired branches were rebranded to other LSL brands in 2010.

Today
LSL currently operates about 140 branches across the United Kingdom,  including some in a franchise format. Simon Embley has served as the Group Chief Executive Officer of LSL Property Services Plc since 2004. From 2001 to 2004 Embley was the managing director of Your Move, where he oversaw its turnaround from a loss-making business to a successful business. 

LSL previously were the owners of Marsh & Parsons, a leading London premium brand estate agency operating in the prime Central, North West, West and South West London property markets out of 32 branches. However, in January 2023, Marsh and Parsons were sold to Dexters, for approximatly 29 million pounds.

References

External links
Company website

Real estate companies established in 2005
Companies based in Newcastle upon Tyne
Property services companies of the United Kingdom
Franchises